Tully Arthur Blanchard (born January 22, 1954) is an American-Canadian professional wrestler and manager. He is best known for his appearances with Jim Crockett Promotions and the World Wrestling Federation in the mid-to-late 1980s as a member of The Four Horsemen and The Brain Busters. Championships held by Blanchard over his career include the NWA World Television Championship, NWA World Tag Team Championship, WWF World Tag Team Championship, and NWA United States Heavyweight Championship. He was inducted into the NWA Hall of Fame in 2009 and the WWE Hall of Fame in 2012.

Early life 
As the son of wrestling promoter and former American Wrestling Association star Joe Blanchard, Tully Blanchard was involved in professional wrestling at a very young age. He began selling programs and refreshments at the arenas at the age of ten, and worked as a referee when he was older.

Blanchard attended West Texas State University, where he played American football, first as a quarterback and then as a defensive end, alongside fellow future wrestlers Tito Santana and Ted DiBiase.

Professional wrestling career

Southwest Championship Wrestling (1975–1984) 
Blanchard was trained to wrestle by his father and José Lothario, debuting in 1975 in his father's promotion, Southwest Championship Wrestling, where he also held a number of backstage production and creative positions. He began his career as a face by tag teaming with his father in a feud against Dory Funk, Jr. and Terry Funk.

Between 1978 and 1983, Blanchard held the SCW Southwest Television Championship and SCW Southwest Heavyweight Championship on seven occasions. He formed heel tag team with Gino Hernandez, "The Dynamic Duo". They held the Texas All-Star USA Tag Team Championship on five occasions and the SCW World Tag Team Championship on one occasion in the early 1980s.

In 1984, Blanchard left SCW for Jim Crockett Promotions.

NWA Jim Crockett Promotions (1984–1988) 

Blanchard came to Jim Crockett, Jr.'s Mid-Atlantic Championship Wrestling (MACW) in early 1984. Blanchard immediately entered into a feud with Mark Youngblood over the NWA Television Championship, which would later be renamed the NWA World Television Championship and WCW World Television Championship. Blanchard won the title on March 28, 1984, and defended the title against some of the top contenders in the territory such as Ricky Steamboat, whom he faced at Starrcade '84.

After Steamboat departed JCP for the WWF, Blanchard and Dusty Rhodes began a feud for the TV title. On March 16, 1985, Rhodes defeated Blanchard to win the NWA Television Championship, ending Blanchard's 353-day reign. The title would soon be renamed the NWA World Television Championship and the two continued to feud throughout the first half of 1985 with Blanchard regaining the title and losing it back to Rhodes in early July 1985 at the Great American Bash inside a steel cage; Rhodes also won the services of Baby Doll for 30 days.

In the mid 80s Tully Blanchard had a series of matches with World Wrestling Council (WWC) Universal Champion Carlos Colon in Puerto Rico and the Continental United States.

After Blanchard's feud with Rhodes ended, he soon found himself immersed in another high-profile feud over the NWA United States Heavyweight Championship held by Magnum T. A. Much like his feud with Dusty Rhodes, Blanchard's rivalry with Magnum escalated into a series of bloody and brutal matches, and became one of the top feuds in the NWA. On July 21, 1985, Blanchard defeated Magnum for the U.S. Championship by punching him with a foreign object in his hand given to him by Baby Doll, who came to ringside dressed as a security guard.

The feud culminated at Starrcade '85 during a brutal and extremely bloody "I quit" match held inside of a steel cage for the title. The match ended with Magnum driving a piece of a broken wooden chair into Blanchard's forehead, which was already deeply cut and bleeding profusely, forcing him to submit.

In late 1985, Blanchard fired Baby Doll as his manager, slapping her during an interview segment and ignited a feud with Dusty Rhodes, who came to her aid. J. J. Dillon then became Blanchard's manager.

Throughout the latter half of 1985, Blanchard and a number of high-profile wrestlers in the company had often competed together, usually in variations of tag team matches or interfering in one another's matches if they appeared to be losing. These wrestlers included Ole Anderson, who had long since become a legendary figure in the Mid-Atlantic and Georgia territories, rising star Arn Anderson and Ric Flair, the biggest star in the promotion and NWA World Heavyweight Champion. In early 1986, the foursome became a solidified group and called themselves the Four Horsemen. The group quickly established dominance within the territory by capturing numerous championships with Arn being the NWA World Television Champion simultaneously, Blanchard winning the NWA National Heavyweight Championship in March 1986 and with Flair as the NWA World Champion. The Horsemen feuded with the top baby faces of the territory including Magnum T. A., Nikita Koloff, Dusty Rhodes, Wahoo McDaniel, The Rock 'n' Roll Express, and The Road Warriors.

The Horsemen continued to feud with the other top stars of the NWA throughout 1986 and 1987, particularly after forcing out Ole Anderson and replacing him with Lex Luger. By mid 1987, Blanchard and Anderson began competing regularly on the tag team circuit and quickly entered into a feud with the Rock 'n' Roll Express over the NWA World Tag Team Championship. The feud culminated in late September after Blanchard and Anderson won the titles after a number of high-profile matches.

Toward the end of 1987 Lex Luger defected from the Horsemen and feuded with all of them over the course of the next several months. Luger quickly formed a partnership with Barry Windham and competed in the tag team division as well. The new duo defeated Anderson and Blanchard on March 27, 1988, though they would lose the titles back to them a little more than a month later after Windham turned on Luger and became the newest Horseman.

World Wrestling Federation (1988–1989) 

After clashing with Jim Crockett and booker Dusty Rhodes about their pay, Blanchard and Arn Anderson left the NWA for the World Wrestling Federation (WWF) on September 10, 1988, losing in an 11th-hour title change to the Midnight Express tandem of Bobby Eaton and Stan Lane after a brief feud. Fellow Horseman Barry Windham and manager J. J. Dillon would leave later for similar reasons; Flair, meanwhile, considered leaving but decided to stay when the NWA signed his old friend Ricky Steamboat and put them in a program together. In the WWF, Blanchard and Anderson were dubbed "The Brain Busters" and paired with heel manager Bobby Heenan. The team defeated Demolition for the WWF Tag Team Championship on July 18, 1989 (aired July 29 on Saturday Night's Main Event XXII), ending Demolition's historic first reign, but lost the titles back to Demolition on October 2, 1989 (aired November 4 on WWF Superstars of Wrestling).

Blanchard and Anderson were planning a return to the NWA. As a result, the WWF pushed a break up angle between Heenan and the Brain Busters on the November 25, 1989 Saturday Night's Main Event XXIV (taped October 31, 1989). Around that time, Blanchard failed a drug test, testing positive for cocaine and causing his premature departure from the WWF and the withdrawal by the NWA of their offer of employment.

Bobby Heenan himself replaced Blanchard as part of the Heenan Family team at the Survivor Series five days later.

Late career (1989–2016) 
Blanchard debuted in the Minneapolis, Minnesota-based American Wrestling Association (AWA) in March 1990, aligning himself with The Destruction Crew. At SuperClash IV on April 8, 1990, he defeated Tommy Jammer. He made his final appearance with the AWA in May 1990.

In 1993, World Championship Wrestling offered Blanchard a US$500 per appearance contract to reform The Four Horsemen at Slamboree 1993. Blanchard did not accept the offer, considering the offer to be too low, and WCW replaced him with Paul Roma. One year later, at Slamboree 1994, Blanchard appeared with WCW for a single night, wrestling Terry Funk to a double disqualification.

In January 1995, Blanchard debuted in the Philadelphia, Pennsylvania-based Extreme Championship Wrestling promotion, wrestling ECW World Heavyweight Champion Shane Douglas to a time limit draw. He challenged Douglas again in February and March, losing on both occasions.

On September 12, 1998, Blanchard teamed up with fellow Four Horseman alumnus, Barry Windham, and defeated the Border Patrol to win the NWA World Tag Team Titles.

In October 1998, he appeared at NWA 50th Anniversary Show teaming with Tom Prichard in four way tag match as The Brotherhood (Knuckles Nelson and Eric Sbraccia) won the NWA TAg Team titles. 

He defeated Stan Lane at the Heroes of Wrestling PPV on October 10, 1999.

In the mid-2000s, Blanchard briefly worked for World Wrestling Entertainment (WWE) as a producer.

On January 29, 2005, at WrestleReunion, Blanchard lost to Jeff Jarrett.  On August 10, 2007, he lost to Dustin Rhodes at an NWA Legends Fanfest in Charlotte, North Carolina.

He appeared prominently in the 2007 DVD Ric Flair and the Four Horsemen. On the March 31, 2008, edition of WWE Raw, Blanchard reunited with Arn Anderson, J. J. Dillon, and Barry Windham to salute the recently retired Ric Flair. In November 2008, he hosted part 2 of the 5 part Essential Starrcade series on WWE 24/7 as well as appearing in one of the matches. On March 31, 2012, Tully Blanchard was inducted into the WWE Hall of Fame as a member of the Four Horsemen.

Blanchard was the head booker of NWA: New Beginnings territory in Charlotte, North Carolina and has been a backstage agent for the wrestling shows as part of the 2010 and 2011 NWA Legends Convention which were in Charlotte, North Carolina and Atlanta, Georgia.

On April 27, 2016, Blanchard appeared alongside Ric Flair and Arn Anderson in an episode of Table For 3 on WWE Network, where the three former members of the Horsemen discussed their lives during and after their years as a team.

All Elite Wrestling

Managing Shawn Spears and FTR (2019–2022)
Blanchard made a surprise appearance during a sit down interview with Jim Ross and Shawn Spears on AEW's "Road to All Out" YouTube series that premiered July 17, 2019.  It was announced the following day that Blanchard had signed a multi-show deal to serve as an "exclusive advisor" for Shawn Spears in All Elite Wrestling. At All Out, Blanchard accompanied Spears for his match against Cody, but in a losing effort after interference from Blanchard's former Four Horsemen stablemate, Arn Anderson, who delivered a spinebuster on Spears and chased Blanchard out of the arena. At Full Gear, Blanchard helped Spears defeat Joey Janela by delivering an assisted piledriver on the concrete. In February 2020, Blanchard and Spears began a campaign to recruit a new tag team partner for Spears. However, the angle was dropped due to the COVID-19 pandemic and Blanchard being unable to appear on television. On the June 3 episode of AEW Dynamite, Blanchard returned and berated Spears for making a joke out of himself at Double or Nothing. He then presented Spears with a black glove similar to the one worn by Blackjack Mulligan and Ted Dibiase. Blanchard officially aligned with FTR on August 22, leading Dax Harwood and Cash Wheeler to defeat Kenny Omega and Adam Page for the AEW World Tag Team Championship at All Out. On the March 3, 2021, special episode of Dynamite (entitled "The Crossroads"), Tully had his first match in 14 years, teaming with FTR to defeat Jurassic Express in a match where they were managed by J. J. Dillon. On March 10, Blanchard, Spears and FTR joined the faction led by MJF named The Pinnacle.
On the March 9th, 2022 episode of Dynamite Tully was fired by FTR as their manager after a disagreement of what FTR's focus as a team should be.

ROH and Tully Blanchard Enterprises (2022) 
After getting fired by FTR, Blanchard was moved to AEW's sister promotion Ring of Honor (ROH). In ROH, Blanchard managed The Gates of Agony (Toa Liona and Kaun) and Brian Cage, collectively known as "Tully Blanchard Enterprises". During the July 23, 2022, Death Before Dishonor, a storyline revealed that Prince Nana had purchased Tully Blanchard Enterprises from Blanchard. It was soon revealed that the group would now be going under The Embassy name, the longtime group associated with Nana dating back to 2004. Later that night during the Death Before Dishonor media scrum, Tony Khan said that Blanchard is doing well personally and wished him the best, saying we could see him in AEW or ROH again in the future.

Personal life 

Blanchard was first married on May 7, 1978, to Elizabeth Diane Boyles in Bexar County, Texas. However, the marriage was brief and ended in divorce on June 30, 1980.

Blanchard later married Courtney Shattuck. Together, they have four children: Taylor, Tanner, Tessa and Tally. They later divorced with Courtney marrying another former wrestler, Magnum T. A., in March 2005. He says it took him twenty years to come to terms with his and his wife's falling-out and his relatively sparse presence in his children's lives. Tessa Blanchard, one of Blanchard's daughters, has followed in her father's footsteps to become a professional wrestler.

Blanchard became a born-again Christian on November 13, 1989. He currently has a prison ministry, where he preaches to inmates. In 2010 Tully Blanchard joined International Network of Prison Ministries, where he serves on the Board of Advisers.

Championships and accomplishments 
Cauliflower Alley Club
Iron Mike Award (2017)
Central States Wrestling
NWA Central States Heavyweight Championship (1 time)
Mid-Atlantic Championship Wrestling / Jim Crockett Promotions
NWA World Television Championship (3 times)
NWA National Heavyweight Championship (1 time)1
NWA United States Heavyweight Championship (1 time)
NWA World Tag Team Championship (Mid-Atlantic version) (2 times) – with Arn Anderson
National Wrestling Alliance
NWA United States Heavyweight Championship (1 time)
NWA United States Heavyweight Championship Tournament (1997)
NWA Hall of Fame (Class of 2009)
New Dimension Wrestling
NDW Heavyweight Championship (2 times)
NWA All-Star Wrestling (North Carolina)2
NWA World Tag Team Championship (1 time) – with Barry Windham
Pro Wrestling Illustrated
PWI Feud of the Year (1987) Four Horsemen vs. The Super Powers and The Road Warriors
PWI Tag Team of the Year (1989) with Arn Anderson
PWI ranked him #52 of the top 500 singles wrestlers of the "PWI Years" in 2003
Southwest Championship Wrestling
SCW Southwest Heavyweight Championship (6 times3)
SCW Southwest Television Championship (3 times)
SCW World Tag Team Championship (2 times) – with Gino Hernandez
SCW Southwest Tag Team Championship (5 times) – with Gino Hernandez
World Wrestling Federation/WWE
WWF Tag Team Championship (1 time) – with Arn Anderson
WWE Hall of Fame (Class of 2012) as a member of The Four Horsemen
Wrestling Observer Newsletter
Worst Feud of the Year (1988) vs. The Midnight Rider

1Typically defended in Georgia, the title was won after the Georgia Championship Wrestling was purchased by the then World Wrestling Federation.2Not to be confused with the Vancouver, British Columbia based promotion that existed from the early '60s to the late '80s. This North Carolina promotion lasted from March 1998 until January 1999.3The last TV title he won on January 12, 1979, was renamed to Heavyweight title in February 1979.

References

External links

 Tully Blanchard at WWE.com
 
 

1954 births
American evangelicals
American football quarterbacks
American male professional wrestlers
Living people
NWA/WCW World Television Champions
NWA/WCW/WWE United States Heavyweight Champions
Professional wrestlers from Calgary
Professional wrestlers from Texas
Professional wrestling referees
Sportspeople from San Antonio
The Four Horsemen (professional wrestling) members
The Heenan Family members
West Texas A&M Buffaloes football players
WWE Hall of Fame inductees
20th-century professional wrestlers
NWA World Tag Team Champions
NWA National Heavyweight Champions
WCW World Tag Team Champions